Vladimir Torubarov ( 22 March 1993) is a Serbian sprint canoer.

He won a bronze medal in the K-2 1000 m event at the 2014 World Championship in Moscow.

References

External links

Biography

1993 births
Living people
Sportspeople from Novi Sad
Serbian male canoeists
Canoeists at the 2015 European Games
European Games competitors for Serbia
Olympic canoeists of Serbia
Canoeists at the 2016 Summer Olympics
ICF Canoe Sprint World Championships medalists in kayak
Mediterranean Games bronze medalists for Serbia
Mediterranean Games medalists in canoeing
Competitors at the 2018 Mediterranean Games